György Sárközi (1899–1945) was a Hungarian poet, translator and writer, and contributor to the literary review Nyugat, then to the journals Pandora (1927), Válasz (1935–1938) and Kélet Népe (1939). As he was Jewish, in 1944 he was deported to the work camp of Balf and died there.

References

1899 births
1945 deaths
Hungarian translators
Writers from Budapest
Translators from German
Hungarian civilians killed in World War II
20th-century translators
Hungarian Jews who died in the Holocaust
Jewish Hungarian writers
Jewish poets
Hungarian World War II forced labourers